Eduard Hoffmann-Krayer (1864–1936) was a Swiss folklorist, Germanist and medievalist, from 1900 professor for phonetics, Swiss dialectology and folklore at the University of Basle and founder of the  Schweizerische Gesellschaft für Volkskunde in 1896.
His 1902 essay Die Volkskunde als Wissenschaft ("Folkloristics as Science") received international attention.

Bibliography 
1913, Feste und Bräuche des Schweizervolkes. Schultheß, Zürich. revised ed. by P. Geiger, 1940, reprint  Olms, Heidelberg 1992, .
1926, Geschichte des deutschen Stils in Einzelbildern. Quelle & Meyer, Leipzig.
ed. P. Geiger, Kleine Schriften zur Volkskunde. . Krebs, Basel 1946.

References 
 Danièle Lenzin: Folklore vivat, crescat, floreat! Über die Anfänge der wissenschaftlichen Volkskunde in der Schweiz um 1900. Zürich 1996, 
 Albert Emanuel Hoffmann: Zum Kaufmann bin ich nicht geboren – gewiss nicht. 2 vols. Limmat, Zürich 1998, 

Swiss folklorists
1936 deaths
1864 births